Padam Padam is a 2011 South Korean television series starring Jung Woo-sung, Han Ji-min, and Kim Bum. The romance / fantasy series was written by Noh Hee-kyung, and the title is a reference to a 1951 French song by Edith Piaf, an onomatopoeia expressing the sound of a heartbeat. It was one of the inaugural dramas on newly launched cable channel JTBC, and aired from December 5, 2011 to February 7, 2012 on Mondays and Tuesdays at 20:45 (KST) time slot for 20 episodes.

Synopsis
A convict named Yang Kang-chil (Jung Woo-sung) serves 16 years in prison for a murder he didn't commit. His innocent nature is protected by his best friend and "guardian angel" Gook-soo (Kim Bum). Prior to his release he experiences a near-death event and only survives thanks to a miracle. Gook-soo explains that Kang-chil will have three near-death miracles and he will only survive them if he learns from the experience.

After his release, Kang-chil becomes a carpenter and falls in love with Jang Ji-na (Han Ji-min) a veterinarian described as a "selfish woman". Despite her selfishness, Ji-na is irrevocably drawn to Kang-chil and falls deeply in love with him. However, things take a turn for the worse when it is revealed that Ji-na's uncle was the victim in Kang-chil's murder case. In order to prove his innocence Kang-chil desperately seeks evidence that will bring the real murderer, Park Chan-gul (Jun-seong Kim), to justice and also save his relationship with Ji-na.

Cast
 Jung Woo-sung as Yang Kang-chil 
 Han Ji-min as Jung Ji-na 
 Kim So-hyun as teenage Ji-na
 Kim Bum as Lee Gook-soo 
 Choi Tae-joon as Im Jung (Kang-chil's son who was raised by his mother's friend)
 Kim Min-kyung as Min Hyo-sook (Kang-chil's ex-girlfriend)
 Lee Jae-woo as Kim Young-cheol
 Na Moon-hee as Kim Mi-ja (Kang-chil's mother)
 Jang Hang-sun as Detective Jung (Ji-na's father)
 Kim Sung-ryung as Ji-na's mother
 Yoon Joo-sang as Prison warden Kim
 Kim Hyung-bum as Oh Yong-hak
 Jun-seong Kim as Park Chan-gul
 Kim Kyu-chul as Prosecutor Joo
 Park Jung-woo as Jin-goo
 Park Sang-hyun as Yang Kang-woo (Kang-chil's brother)
 Lee Ha-yool as Lee Yoo-jin
 Jeon Gook-hwan

Ratings
In this table,  represent the lowest ratings and  represent the highest ratings.

International broadcast

The drama aired on TV Asahi beginning February 3, 2013.
 Philippines: Aired on GMA Network from June 24 to October 10, 2013, and was later re-aired on GMA News TV in 2019.
 Thailand: Aired on True Asian Series in 2012.

References

External links
  
 
 

Korean-language television shows
2011 South Korean television series debuts
2012 South Korean television series endings
Television shows written by Noh Hee-kyung
JTBC television dramas
South Korean romantic fantasy television series